Little Miss Carriage! is an EP by the hardcore punk band, Didjits, released on October 2, 1992, through Touch and Go Records. It was the first to not feature Rick Sims’s brother, Brad Sims, on drums.

Track listing

Personnel 
Didjits
Doug Evans – bass guitar, vocals (Sugarfox only)
Rick Sims (a.k.a. Rick Dijit) – Vocals, guitar
Rey Washam – drums
Production and additional personnel
Steve Albini – production
Mary Perez – photography

References

External links 
 

1992 EPs
Albums produced by Steve Albini
The Didjits albums
Touch and Go Records EPs